Voronkiv is an urban-type settlement in northern Ukraine, located in Boryspil Raion of Kyiv Oblast.

History

The Olizar family inherited this village and the surrounding lands, then later leased it to Sophia Teofila Danylovychivna, leading to many legal court proceedings surrounding the ownership of the village.

During the Holodomor, this village, like many others throughout Ukraine, experienced widespread hunger, leading to numerous deaths from starvation.

References

External links 

 Историческая информация о местечке Вороньков (Archived in Russian)
 Облікова картка на сайті ВРУ
 Інформація порталу who-is-who.ua
 http://borvisti.com.ua/arcvisti/index.php?read=2096 (Archived)
 Які маєтки замість храму будують на пожертви прихожан намісник і казначей Лаври

Urban-type settlements in Boryspil Raion